The Rain Parade is a band that was originally active in the Paisley Underground scene in Los Angeles in the 1980s, and that reunited and resumed touring in 2012.

History

Rain Parade in the 1980s (1981–86)
Originally called the Sidewalks, the band was founded in Minnesota by college roommates Matt Piucci (guitar, vocals) and David Roback (guitar, vocals) in 1981, while they were attending Carleton College. David's brother Steven Roback (bass, vocals) joined the band shortly thereafter. David and Steven had been in a band called the Unconscious with neighbor Susanna Hoffs (who went on to become a member of the Bangles, the most famous of the Paisley Underground bands). The band soon added Will Glenn (keyboards and violin) and later Eddie Kalwa (drums). They self-released their debut single, "What She's Done to Your Mind" on their Llama label in 1982.

In 1983, they released their debut album, Emergency Third Rail Power Trip, on the Enigma/Zippo label. Critic Jim DeRogatis would later write in his book Turn on Your Mind: Four Decades of Great Psychedelic Rock (2003) that "Emergency Third Rail Power Trip is not only the best album from any of the Paisley Underground bands, it ranks with the best psychedelic rock efforts from any era", with uplifting melodies offset by themes that were "dark and introspective." According to DeRogatis, the album showcased "the Robacks' ethereal vocals, Eddie Kalwa's precise drumming, Will Glenn's colorful sitar, violin, and keyboard accents, and an intricate, chiming, but droney two-guitar attack that picks up where the Byrds left off with 'Eight Miles High.'"

After David Roback left to form a new band, Opal, the rest of the band continued to record as a four-piece, releasing the mini-LP Explosions in the Glass Palace in 1984. NME would later write, in praise of Explosions in the Glass Palace: "Sound cathedrals? We got ‘em ... mind-meltingly beautiful guitar sounds, employed sparingly and dynamically amid dark, dizzy tales of murder, madness and drug paranoia." The song "No Easy Way Down" was cited as a "mantra for an altered state of mind, and testament to a band who, however fleetingly, made music that sounded like the best drugs ever."

After the release of a single, "You Are My Friend", drummer Eddie Kalwa left and was replaced by Mark Marcum, with John Thoman (guitar, vocals) also added to the line-up.

The band was signed to Island Records, and recorded a live album in Japan called Beyond the Sunset. Their third album, Crashing Dream, came out in 1985.

Breakup and other projects (1986–2012)
The band split in 1986, reforming briefly in 1988 to finish off a double album they had started, which was never released.

Piucci would go on to release the LP Can't Get Lost When You're Goin' Nowhere with Tim Lee, under the band name Gone Fishin'. He later joined Crazy Horse.

Steven Roback went on to form the band Viva Saturn whose debut release appeared on the San Francisco label Heyday Records, which was run at the time by Pat Thomas of the band Absolute Grey. Viva Saturn went on to release two additional LPs, Soundmind and Brightside.

David Roback made the album Rainy Day, featuring cover versions performed by various leading lights of the Paisley Underground. He formed the Clay Allison Band and Opal, both with former Dream Syndicate bassist Kendra Smith, and later formed Mazzy Star with Hope Sandoval.

Keyboardist Will Glenn was also a member of the Rainy Day project, The Three O'Clock, and  Viva Saturn.  He also recorded with Mazzy Star under the name William Cooper.  Glenn died of cancer on March 16, 2001.

Mark Marcum joined the heavy metal band Savage Grace after leaving Rain Parade and appeared on their 1986 album After the Fall from Grace and 1987 EP Ride into the Night.

Reunion and comeback (2012–present)
The Rain Parade reformed in 2012, performing their comeback gig on December 20, 2012 at Cafe Du Nord in San Francisco on a sold out bill with Powder and the Bang Girl Group Revue. The Rain Parade lineup included original members Matt Piucci, Steven Roback and John Thoman, augmented by Mark Hanley, Alec Palao and former Game Theory drummer Gil Ray. This lineup also performed at The Earl in Atlanta, GA on January 19, 2013. This show was a benefit for Bobby Sutliff of The Windbreakers, who had been injured in a car accident.

In December 2013, Rain Parade played two nights with three other reunited Paisley Underground bands—the Bangles, the Dream Syndicate, and the Three O'Clock—at The Fillmore in San Francisco (Dec. 5) and The Fonda Theatre in Los Angeles (Dec. 6 benefit concert).

In 2014, drummer Gil Ray gave up performing due to health concerns, and was replaced in the lineup by returning member Stephan Junca. Ray died of cancer in 2017.

Three new recordings by Rain Parade were released in November 2018 as part of a compilation album called 3 × 4, which also included the Dream Syndicate, the Bangles, and the Three O'Clock, 
with each of the four bands covering songs by the other bands. Following the initial Record Store Day First release as a double album on "psychedelic swirl" purple vinyl, Yep Roc Records released the album on LP, CD, and digital in February 2019.

David Roback died from metastatic cancer on February 25, 2020.

Discography

Albums
Emergency Third Rail Power Trip (1983) Enigma/Zippo (UK Indie No. 5)
Crashing Dream (1985) Island

Live albums and compilations
Beyond the Sunset (Live in Tokyo 1984) (1985) Restless/Island (UK No. 78)
Demolition (1991) – outtakes and unreleased material
Emergency Third Rail Power Trip/Explosions in the Glass Palace (1992) Mau Mau
Perfume River (2002) – live in New York, November 1984
3 × 4 (2018 compilation) Yep Roc Records #27 Billboard Independent Albums

Singles and EPs
"What She's Done to Your Mind" b/w "Kaleidoscope" (1982) Llama DK002
Explosions in the Glass Palace mini-LP (1984) Enigma/Zippo (UK Indie No. 4)
"Sad Eyes Kill" (1984)
"You Are My Friend" (1985) Enigma/Zippo (UK Indie No. 28)

See also
Crazy Horse
Hellenes
Mazzy Star
Opal
Viva Saturn

References

External links
[ Rain Parade on Allmusic]
Alan McGee on the Rain Parade in his Guardian Newspaper Column

Alternative rock groups from California
Jangle pop groups
Musical groups established in 1981
Musical groups disestablished in 1986
Musical groups reestablished in 1988
Musical groups disestablished in 1988
Musical groups reestablished in 2012
Musical groups from Los Angeles
Psychedelic rock music groups from California
Enigma Records artists
Sibling musical groups